Frieschepalen is a village in the municipality of Opsterland in the east of Friesland, the Netherlands. It had a population of around 1,015 in January 2017.

History 
The village was first mentioned in 1622 as Vriesche Palen, and means "Frisian border poles" which refers to the border with the province of Groningen. A sconce was built in 1593 on the border to guard against the Spanish. The sconce was conquered in 1672 by Christoph Bernhard von Galen, the Prince-Bishop of Münster.

In 1650, the Drachtster Compagnonsvaart was dug and Frieschepalen developed into a peat colony. In 1927, a Reformed Church was built in the village.

Gallery

References

External links

Populated places in Friesland
Geography of Opsterland